System Overload is the first album released by Dutch After Forever guitarist Sander Gommans's side project HDK (Hate, Death, Kill). The music of this album is heavier and more extreme than the usual style of After Forever and Gommans created HDK in order to release the album by himself. The album was released on 23 February 2009 on the Label Season of Mist. The many guest musicians involved in the making of this album produced and recorded their parts separately in various recording studios, following basic tracks provided by Gommans.

Track listing
All music by Sander Gommans, all lyrics by Amanda Somerville.
"System Overload" – 3:02
"Request" – 4:33
"Let Go" – 3:33
"Terrorist" – 4:19
"Pedestal" – 5:23
"On Hold" – 3:23
"Breakdown" – 5:06
"March" – 4:04
"Perfect" – 5:14
"Fight or Flight" – 4:06
"Fine Lines" – 4:55

Personnel
HDK
Sander Gommans - rhythm/solo/acoustic guitars, grunts/screams/whispers on tracks 2, 3, 5, 7, 8, 9 and 11
Peter Vink – bass
Ariën van Weesenbeek – drums

Guests musicians
Amanda Somerville – female vocals/whispers on tracks 1, 2, 3, 4, 5, 7, 8, 9 and 10
Joost van den Broek – additional keyboards on tracks 7 and 9, lead keyboards on tracks 5 and 11
Arjen Lucassen - guitar solo on track 9
Marcel Coenen - guitar solo on track 10
Bastiaan Kuiper - guitar solo on track 5
Andre Matos - clean vocals on tracks 2 and 11
Jos Severens - additional clean vocals on tracks 1, 4, 9, 10 and 11
Patrick Savelkoul - grunts/screams on tracks 1, 6 and 10
Mike Scheijen - screams on tracks 4, 8 and 11
Paul Niessen - rap vocals on tracks 5, 7 and 11, artwork

Production
Sander Gommans - producer, engineer, mixing
Amanda Somerville - vocal producer
Joost van den Broek - producer and engineer for keyboards and drums recordings, mixing
Hans Pieters – producer and engineer for drums recording
Arjen Lucassen – producer and engineer for bass recording and guitar solo on track 9
Marcel Coenen – engineer for guitar solo on track 10
Darius van Helfterenn – mastering at Wisseloord Studios, Hilversum
Jérôme Cros – artwork at Season of Mist Graphic Desk
Andrea Beckers, Felix Scharf – photography

References 

2009 debut albums
HDK (band) albums
Season of Mist albums